The Chaetosphaeriaceae are a family of fungi in the Ascomycota, class Sordariomycetes. The family was circumscribed by Martina Réblová, Margaret Elizabeth Barr Bigelow, and Gary Samuels in 1999. Species in the family have a cosmopolitan distribution, and are found in both temperate and tropical climates. Fossils of the Chaetosphaeriaceae are known from the Carboniferous, Eocene, Oligocene, Miocene and more recent sediments.

Genera
As accepted by GBIF;

 Adautomilanezia  (2)
 Anaexserticlava  (1)
 Aposphaeriella (1)
 Ascochalara  (1)
 Calvolachnella  (2)
 Catenularia  (16)
 Chaetolentomita (1)
 Chaetosphaeria  (184)
 Chloridium  (45)
 Cirrhomyces (1)
 Codinaea  (21)
 Conicomyces  (5)
 Craspedodidymum  (14)
 Cylindrotrichum  (28)
 Dendrophoma  (9)
 Dictyochaeta  (87)
 Dictyochaetopsis  (13)
 Didymopsamma (1)
 Eucalyptostroma  (4)
 Fuscocatenula  (2)
 Gonytrichum  (4)
 Hemicorynespora  (13)
 Infundibulomyces  (6)
 Kylindria  (13)
 Lecythothecium  (1)
 Lentomita  (11)
 Melanochaeta  (4)
 Melanopsammina (1)
 Menispora  (24)
 Menisporopascus  (1)
 Menisporopsis  (14)
 Mesobotrys (1)
 Miyoshiella  (2)
 Montemartinia (1)
 Morrisiella (1)
 Nawawia  (8)
 Neopseudolachnella  (5)
 Paliphora  (8)
 Paragaeumannomyces  (14)
 Phaeostalagmus  (8)
 Phialogeniculata  (4)
 Phialolunulospora  (1)
 Pseudodinemasporium  (2)
 Pseudolachnea  (8)
 Pseudolachnella  (26)
 Pyrigemmula  (4)
 Sporoschisma  (28)
 Stanjehughesia  (17)
 Striatosphaeria (3)
 Tainosphaeria  (9)
 Thozetella  (40)
 Thozetellopsis  (1)
 Trichocollonema (1)
 Uncigera  (1)
 Verhulstia (1)
 Zanclospora  (11)
 Zignoella  (79)

Figures in brackets are approx. how many species per genus.

Former genera Australiasca now within Australiascaceae family and Porosphaerella now within Cordanaceae family.

References

Chaetosphaeriales
 Ascomycota families
Taxa described in 1999
Taxa named by Margaret Elizabeth Barr-Bigelow